The 2017 Extreme Sailing Series are the eleventh edition of the sailing series and the seventh year of it being a fully global event. In 2017 the series continues in the GC32 foiling catamaran after the series moved away from the Extreme 40 in 2016.

Acts

Act 1: Muscat, Oman 
The first act of the series was held again in Muscat, Oman, on the weekend of 8–11 March 2017 .

Act 2: Qingdao, China 
As last year, Qingdao, China was the host of the second act of the 2017 series, on the weekend of 28 April to 1 May 2017.

Act 3: Funchal, Madeira Islands 
For the second time, Madeira hosted the series as the third act in Marina Funchal, on the weekend of 29 June to 2 July 2017.

Act 4: Barcelona, Spain 
Barcelona, Spain hosted the fourth act, on the weekend of 20–23 July 2017.

Act 5: Hamburg, Germany 
Act 5 was held in Hamburg, Germany for the third time, on 10–13 August 2017.

Act 6: Cardiff, UK 
For the sixth time, Cardiff, Wales will again be a host city, it will be held on the bank holiday weekend of 25–28 August 2017.

Act 7: San Diego, United States 
San Diego, United States will be a venue for the series this year, due to be held on 19–22 October 2017.

Act 8: Los Cabos, Mexico 
The final act will be held in Los Cabos, Mexico, the first time as a venue in the Extreme Sailing Series. It's due to be held on the weekend of 30 November to 3 December 2017.

Teams

Alinghi
The defending champions also won the title in 2008 and 2014.

The team includes Ernesto Bertarelli (skipper/helm), Arnaud Psarofaghis (skipper/helm), Nicolas Charbonnier (tactician), Nils Frei (headsail trimmer), Yves Detrey (bowman) and Timothé Lapauw (foil trimmer).

Land Rover BAR Academy
The Ben Ainslie Racing academy team consists of Rob Bunce (skipper/bowman), Chris Taylor/Owen Bowerman (helmsman), Sam Batten (headsail trimmer), Oli Greber/Adam Kay/Matt Brushwood (trimmer/floater) and Elliot Hanson/Will Alloway (mainsail trimmer).

NZ Extreme Sailing Team
A new team to the series, they are led by co-skippers Chris Steele and Graeme Sutherland and also include Harry Hull, Josh Salthouse, Josh Junior, Andy Maloney, and George Anyon.

Oman Air
The team includes skipper Phil Robertson, Pete Greenhalgh, Ed Smyth, Nasser Al Mashari and James Wierzbowski.

Red Bull Sailing Team
The team includes skipper Roman Hagara, Hans Peter Steinacher, Stewart Dodson, Will Tiller and Adam Piggott.

SAP Extreme Sailing Team
The team includes co-skippers Jes Gram-Hansen and Rasmus Køstner, Adam Minoprio, Pierluigi de Felice, Mads Emil Stephensen and Richard Mason.

Wild cards

FNOB Impulse
Racing in Barcelona, FNOB Impulse included Jordi Xammar, Joan Cardona, Luis Bugallo, Kevin Cabrera and Florian Trittel.

Team Extreme
Team Extreme is skippered by veteran Mitch Booth and includes Alberto Torné, Jordi Sánchez, Tom Buggy, Jordi Booth, Freddie White, Joan Costa and Ruben Booth.

Lupe Tortilla Demetrio
Helmed by John Tomko, the team included Jonathan Atwood, Matthew Whitehead and Tripp and Trevor Burd.

Results

References

External links 
 
 Official gallery

2017
2017 in sailing
2017 in Omani sport
2017 in Chinese sport
2017 in German sport
2017 in Welsh sport
2017 in Russian sport
2017 in Turkish sport
2017 in Australian sport
Sports competitions in Cardiff
2017 in Portuguese sport